Dr. Buzzard's Original Savannah Band is the debut studio album by Dr. Buzzard's Original Savannah Band. It was released in 1976 by RCA. It peaked at number 22 on the Billboard 200 chart and number 31 on the Top R&B Albums chart.

In his book Turn the Beat Around: The Secret History of Disco, music writer Peter Shapiro described the album as "one of the most fully realized, dazzling artifacts from the black bohemian intelligentsia".

Track listing

Personnel
Dr. Buzzard's Original Savannah Band
 Cory Daye – vocals
 Don Armando Bonilla – percussion
 Stony Browder – guitar, keyboards, vocals
 August Darnell – bass, vocals
 Andy "Coati Mundi" Hernandez – percussion
 Mickey Sevilla – drums

Charts

References

External links
 

1976 debut albums
Dr. Buzzard's Original Savannah Band albums
RCA Records albums